Events from the year 1933 in Taiwan, Empire of Japan.

Incumbents

Central government of Japan
 Prime Minister: Saitō Makoto

Taiwan
 Governor-General – Nakagawa Kenzō

Events

March
 2 March – The completion of Ōgon Shrine in Taihoku Prefecture.
 3 March – Ching Yun University is established.

November
 28 November – The opening of Tamsui Church in Taihoku Prefecture.

Births
 3 April – Fu Da-ren, Taiwanese television presenter (d. 2018)

References

 
1930s in Taiwan
Years of the 20th century in Taiwan